The Citizens' Bloc 381 ( / Građanski blok 381) was a coalition of political parties in Serbia. The Bloc was founded by Saša Janković in 2018.

Name
According to Janković, "381" was used as part of the name of the Bloc because it represents the country calling code of Serbia, which is +381.

Political program
Some of key elements of the program of the Citizens' Bloc 381 were:
 Personal freedom, civic society and democracy
 Accession of Serbia to the European Union
 Market economy and social justice
 Humane security, zero tolerance for criminal and corruption
 Creation of conditions for peaceful, democratic and fair elections

Members

Former members
On 5 November 2018, the Green Ecological Party – The Greens left the Bloc.

References

External links

2018 disestablishments in Serbia
2018 establishments in Serbia
Defunct political party alliances in Serbia
Political parties disestablished in 2018
Political parties established in 2018